The site of the Santiago Surrender Tree (also known as the Tree of Peace or ), located in Santiago, Cuba, marks where Spanish forces surrendered to U.S. forces on July 17, 1898, at the end of the Spanish–American War.

Background
The ceiba tree had been the site of previous prisoner exchanges. On July 1, 1898, U.S. and Cuban troops had taken Fort El Viso, El Caney and San Juan Hill. These victories led to the U.S. victory at Santiago de Cuba.

Current status
Per United States law, the site is to be maintained by the American Battle Monuments Commission since 1958. The tree is now gone, but cannon and plaques continue to mark the surrender site.

See also
 Clara Barton
 Rough Riders
 Battle of Las Guasimas

References

External links
 Cuban Battlefields
 Library of Congress
 Spanish-Cuban-American War Surrender of Santiago de Cuba July 13, 1898
 Prisoner Exchange Tree, Santiago, Cuba, 1898
 http://www.studenthandouts.com/Cuba/004-Surrender-Tree.htm 

History of Santiago de Cuba
American Battle Monuments Commission